The Domestic Extremism Lexicon is a reference aid released by the United States Department of Homeland Security (DHS) that defines different classifications of extremists. The document was released on March 26, 2009.

References

External links
 DHS Domestic Extremism Lexicon
 Rightwing Extremism: Current Economic and Political Climate Fueling Resurgence In Radicalization and Recruitment 7 April 2009

Terrorism in the United States
United States Department of Homeland Security
Extremism